Lesiaki may refer to the following places:
Lesiaki, Gmina Klonowa in Łódź Voivodeship (central Poland)
Lesiaki, Gmina Złoczew in Łódź Voivodeship (central Poland)
Lesiaki, Pomeranian Voivodeship (north Poland)